Saint-Amand-des-Hautes-Terres is a former commune in the Eure department in Normandy in northern France. On 1 January 2016, it was merged into the new commune of Amfreville-Saint-Amand.

Population

See also
Communes of the Eure department

References

Former communes of Eure
Populated places disestablished in 2016